Circapina flexalana is a species of moth of the family Tortricidae.

The ground colour of the forewings is white, sprinkled with brown and red-brown scales. Adults have been recorded on wing from February to December.

Etymology
The species name refers to the reflexed or curved distal portion of the aedeagus.

References

External links

Moths described in 2003
Endemic fauna of Costa Rica
Euliini